Kilakalkandarkottai  is a village in Tiruchirappalli taluk of Tiruchirappalli district in Tamil Nadu, India. It was merged with the Tiruchirappalli Corporation in 2011.

Demographics 

As per the 2001 census, Kilakalkandarkottai had a population of 1,472 with 740 males and 732 females. The sex ratio was 989 and the literacy rate, 87.01.

References 

Neighbourhoods and suburbs of Tiruchirappalli